Marten Winkler (born 31 October 2002) is a German footballer who plays as a forward for Waldhof Mannheim on loan from  club Hertha BSC.

Club career
Winkler was born in Frankfurt an der Oder. After playing youth football for Union Fürstenwalde and Union Berlin, he joined Hertha BSC's academy in 2015. He made his debut for Hertha BSC on 15 May 2021 as a substitute in a 0–0 draw with 1. FC Köln.

International career
He has represented Germany at under-18 level.

References

External links

2002 births
Living people
German footballers
Sportspeople from Frankfurt (Oder)
Footballers from Brandenburg
Association football forwards
Germany youth international footballers
FSV Union Fürstenwalde players
1. FC Union Berlin players
Hertha BSC players
Hertha BSC II players
SV Waldhof Mannheim players
Bundesliga players
3. Liga players
Regionalliga players